Meriam (also Miriam, Meryam, Mer, Mir, Miriam-Mir, etc. and Eastern, Isten, Esten and Able Able) or the Eastern Torres Strait language is the language of the people of the small islands of Mer (Murray Island), Waier and Dauar, Erub (Darnley Island), and Ugar (Stephens Island) in the eastern Torres Strait, Queensland, Australia. In the Western Torres Strait language, Kalaw Lagaw Ya, it is called Mœyam or Mœyamau Ya. It is the only Papuan language in Australian territory.

Classification
Meriam was classified in the Eastern Trans-Fly family of the Trans–New Guinea Phylum by Stephen Wurm, who however felt that these have retained remnants of pre-Trans–New Guinea languages; this is followed by Ethnologue (2005). In 2005 Malcolm Ross concluded that the Eastern Trans-Fly languages were not part of the Trans–New Guinea phylum. R. M. W. Dixon (2002) regards claims of a relationship between the Fly River languages and Meriam as unproven, though what he bases his claim on is not clear, as Meriam Mir has a high cognacy rate with its sister languages, and a certain amount of mutual intelligibility is claimed by Meriam speakers. Mitchell finds that Meriam Mìr has 78% cognates with its sister Trans-Fly Papuan languages, the remaining vocabulary being mainly of Australian origin. Such Trans-Fly cognates include personal pronouns, and verbal and nominal morphology.

Status
In the 2016 Australian census, 217 speakers were recorded, up slightly on the previous (2011) census, which recorded 186. It is considered an endangered language by UNESCO.

There is a push to preserve the language in North Queensland. A group of Torres Strait Islander people in Mackay region, where there are only four fluent speakers left, are practising and teaching traditional hymns sung in Meriam Mir in an effort to help more people to learn the language and pass it down. It is hoped that a program to teach the hymns will be introduced into schools.

Meriam Mìr and its neighbours

Meriam has around 40 percent of its vocabulary in common with its unrelated Western Torres Strait neighbour Kala Lagaw Ya, which is an Australian language. The shared words cover a wide range of semantic domains (body parts, kin, human classification, language, mythology, ceremony, artefacts, topography, natural elements, marine life, qualities, locations, directions and time), though not verbs. This latter strengthens arguments about genetic diversity, however there is still much to suggest mutual influence. The common vocabulary range from "exact cognates" to words that appear related, but have undergone semantic changes, as in the following selected from a list of 250 items (Mitchell 1995) (where exact "cognates" number 62 (24.8%), partial "cognates" 26 (10%) and "cognates" with semantic differentiation number 34 (13.7%), [122 "cognates" in total, 48.8%]):

There are also various items of semantic relationship, but not formal relationship, such as WCL puuy(i), MM lu "plant, tree; magic".

Mitchell and Piper (unpublished research notes) used the Holman et al. 40-word list below, which shows 9 (22.5%) exact items, 5 (12.5%) partial, and 3 (7.5%) semantically related words. However, this list was designed for use with Euro-Asian languages, and is perhaps somewhat inappropriate; for example, no horned animals exist, neither language has a verb ‘come’, and Holman et al. assume one form for 'we'; WCL has 4, and MM has 2.

PCD Proto Central-District Papuan Austronesian, PETrf Proto East Trans Fly; POC Proto Oceanic Austronesian; PP Proto Paman; PSEPap Proto South-East Papuan Austronesian [neighbouring languages noted : Papuan : Gizrra, Bine/Kunini, Wipi (Eastern Trans Fly Family), Kiwai (Trans-New Guinea Phylum), Idi, Agöb (Pahoturi family); Australian : Gudang, and the Northern Cape York Language, dialects : Wudhadhi, Atampaya, Angkamuthi, Yadhaykenu]

Recent loans
The main source of loan words to the language since the mid 1800s has been Yumplatòk (Torres Strait Creole) and English. There are also some minor loans from Lifu/Drehu, Polynesian (in particular Samoan and to a lesser extent Rotuman), Indonesian, Philippine, Japanese, and European origin.  Many such outsiders were recruited – or in some rare cases black-birded – in the 19th century for pearl diving and other marine work, while others (from Lifu and Samoa) were missionaries with the British and Foreign Bible Society.

Dialects

The language is currently dialectless.  However, there was once a separate dialect spoken on Erub and Ugar islands, characterised in part by the retention of phonemic distinctions between 'ng', 'g', 'n' and 'r' where these have fallen together in two ways in Meriam Mir.  The sound 'ng' in Modern Meriam has become 'n' at the beginning of words and 'g' within words; 'n' in many cases has become 'r' within words. Examples are remembered in one important Erub folktale (Lawrie 1970:283–284):

Erub : Aka nade ki andinane?  Ge au?

Mer  : Aka nade ki ardirare?  Ge au?

Where will we put it?  There?

Erub : Mena inggandane/ingandane!  Keniba uzen unken a keniba imut unken.

Mer  : Mena igardare!  Keriba uzer urker a keriba imut urker.

Keep carrying it!  Our paddles and our poling poles are still strong.

The earliest records (early 19th century) of Meriam Mìr included the phrase debelang good taste/nice, in present-day Meriam Mìr debe lag. This shows that the 'ng' > 'n'/'g' change is of fairly recent date; lang, now lag, is identical to the Gizrra lang of the same meaning.

Phonology

Vowels

Older speakers appear to keep the vowels more distinct.

Consonants

Stress
Stress is contrastive in Meriam and can occur on the first or second syllable. Examples include tábo 'snake', tabó 'neck'.

Sign language
The Torres Strait Islanders have signed forms of their languages, though it is not clear from records that they are particularly well-developed compared to other Australian Aboriginal sign languages.

See also
Torres Strait Island languages

References

Bibliography

External links

  
Opolera Wetpur Anglican Holy Communion service in Meriam
Kala Lagaw Ya & Miriam Mir (Torres Strait Islands) Community Language Journey Digital Story, State Library of Queensland. Part of Spoken: Celebrating Queensland Languages Digital Stories Collection

Eastern Trans-Fly languages
Torres Strait Islands culture
Languages of Australia